Pia Julin (born 26 December 1969) is a Finnish sports shooter. She competed in the women's double trap event at the 2000 Summer Olympics.

References

External links
 

1969 births
Living people
Finnish female sport shooters
Olympic shooters of Finland
Shooters at the 2000 Summer Olympics
People from Kauniainen
Sportspeople from Uusimaa